Sándor Bortnyik (July 3, 1893 – December 31, 1976) was a Hungarian painter and graphic designer. His work was greatly influenced by Cubism, Expressionism and Constructivism.

Life
He moved to Weimar in 1922 and was connected to the Bauhaus. When he moved back to Hungary he founded an art school (Workshop) in Budapest, where he followed Bauhaus principles.

Bortnyik is well known for his commercial posters. During his long career he worked for many Hungarian and international clients. The most famous works are the advertising images for Modiano cigarette papers.

He was also the director of Hungarian Academy of Fine Arts (1949–1956).

He is buried in Kerepesi Cemetery.

See also
The New Adam

References

External links

Works by Sándor Bortnyik
Sándor (Alexander) Bortnyik , MoMa

1893 births
1976 deaths
Hungarian graphic designers
Hungarian poster artists
Art educators
20th-century Hungarian painters
20th-century Hungarian male artists
Hungarian University of Fine Arts
Hungarian male painters